Wolfcry is the fourth installment of the Kiesha'ra Series by American author Amelia Atwater-Rhodes.  The book is narrated by Oliza Shardae Cobriana, a fictional character who is the daughter of Zane Cobriana, a cobra shapeshifter, and Danica Shardae, a hawk shapeshifter. She lives in a world of cobra, avian, and falcon shapeshifters, and is currently heir to the throne of both cobras and avians in an attempt by her parents to unite both cultures, who have been at war with each other for countless years.

Plot
Oliza relating her troubles in being heir to the throne of a divided nation.  Though the avians and serpiente have put down their weapons, prejudice and hatred still run strong between the two kinds.

Betia manages to return to human form out of concern for Oliza.

At Oliza's request, the leader of the Obsidian Guild relates the story of the fallout between the two leaders of the Dasi.
She then takes Betia to the market, where they have a shocking meeting with several avian merchants who are convinced that the three men convicted of harming Urban are not guilty.

The three men are a blatant example of the differences between serpiente and avians. 
A vision of the future. Oliza can feel Nicias step in with his magic to keep the spell under control before she is lost in visions.

Oliza goes to the courtyard and confronts the mercenaries, telling them she was the one who hired them to kidnap her, she just didn't remember it.

Velyo becomes furious and threatens her, but Oliza punches him and reminds him that as a half-cobra, she has full use of a cobra's deadly poison and could kill him in a few seconds. Velyo turns into wolf form and moves away with his tail between his legs.

Sequel
The final book in the series is called Wyvernhail, which features Hai the Cobriana daughter of Anjay(Zane Cobriana's older brother).

2006 American novels
American fantasy novels

Novels by Amelia Atwater-Rhodes
Nyeusigrube